Phanocles was a Greek elegiac poet who probably flourished about the time of Alexander the Great.

His extant fragments show resemblances in style and language to Philitas of Cos, Callimachus and Hermesianax. He was the author of a poem on pederasty, entitled Loves or Beautiful Boys. A lengthy fragment in Stobaeus (Florilegium, 64) describes the love of Orpheus for the youthful Calaîs, son of Boreas, and his subsequent death at the hands of the Thracian women. Erotes e Kaloi describes among others the love between Dionysos and Adonis, Cycnus and Phaethon, Tantalos and Ganymedes, and of Agamemnon and Argynnos. It is one of the best extant specimens of Greek elegiac poetry.

References
 
 
Katherina Alexander, A stylistic commentary on Phanocles and related texts. (Amsterdam, 1988)

External links
 Phanocles, Fragment 1, translation by S. Burges Watson, Living Poets, (Durham, 2014)

Ancient Greek poets
4th-century BC Greek people
4th-century BC poets
Ancient Greek elegiac poets
Hellenistic poets
Greek mythology of Thrace